The Melbourne School of Theology (MST) is an evangelical Christian theological college with its main campus in Wantirna, an eastern suburb of Melbourne, Victoria, Australia.

The school has a Chinese department, known as MST Chinese, in which undergraduate and graduate courses are taught in both Mandarin and Cantonese. It also has a postgraduate research section known as MST Centre for the Study of Chinese Christianity.

In 2011 the main (Wantirna) campus relocated from the suburb of Lilydale in the outer eastern suburbs of Melbourne to its present location. The Chinese department, which used to operate in Box Hill, also relocated to the new campus and was renamed MST Chinese.

List of principals
C. H. Nash (1920–1942)
John W. Searle (1944–1963)
J. Graham Miller (1965–1970)
Neville Andersen (1971–1980)
Arthur Cundall (1981–1989) 
David Price (1990–2004)
Michael Raiter (2006–2011)
Tim Meyers (2012–)

References

External links
Official website

Educational institutions established in 1920
Australian College of Theology
Education in Melbourne
Evangelical seminaries and theological colleges in Australia
1920 establishments in Australia